The Women's Roller Hockey World Cup is a competition between the best female national teams in the World. It takes place every two years and it was organized by the FIRS until its integration into World Skate.

History
Roller Hockey has a Women's Championship which has taken place every two years since 1992 until 2017, when the FIRS agreed to integrate the championship into the World Roller Games. It is now organized by the World Skate.

The first edition, played in 1992, was played with the traditional quads except for the Canadian team, who wore inline skates.

Due to the 2022 Russian invasion of Ukraine, World Skate banned Russian and Belarusian athletes and officials from its competitions, and will not stage any events in Russia or Belarus in 2022.

Summary

Medal table

See also 
Roller Hockey World Cup
Roller Hockey World Cup U-20
 U17 Female Club Tournament

References

External links

Ladies Rink Hockey World Championship Champions at HoqueiPatins.cat
 Official website of the 10th Ladies Rink Hockey World Championship 2010 
 Official website of the 8th Ladies Rink Hockey World Championship 2006 
 List of Ladies Winners and places from 1992 to 2002 
 FIRS Organizational chart
Comité Européen de Rink-Hockey CERH website
CIRH website
Real Federação Portuguesa de Patinagem
Real Federation Espanola de Patinaje
Federazione Intaliana Hockey e Pattinaggio
 Federação Angolana de Patinagem
 Confederation Argentina de Patinage
 Skate Australia
 Federation Belge Francophone De Patinage
 Confederação Brasileira de Hóquei e Patinação
 The Canadian In-Line & Roller Skating Association
 Federatión Chilena de Hockey y Patinaje
 Federatión Colombiana de Patinaje
 Roller Hockey Egypt
 National Roller Hockey Association of England
 Comité National Rink Hockey
 Deutscher Rollsport
 Hong Kong Federation of Roller Sports
 South Korean Federation of Roller Sports
 Fédération Suisse de Rink-Hockey
 Irish Roller Hockey Association
 http://rinkhockeyinisrael.blogspot.com/
 Japan Roller Sports Federation
 Hóquei Macau
 Hockey Mexico
              New Zealand Federation of Roller Sports
 The South African Roller Hockey Federation
Federación Uruguaya de Patín y Hockey
 USA Roller Sports
Nederland Roller Hockey
 Roller Hockey links worldwide
 Mundook-World Roller Hockey
Hardballhock-World Roller Hockey
Inforoller World Roller Hockey
 World Roller Hockey Blog
rink-hockey-news - World Roller Hockey
SoloHockey World Roller Hockey
Rink Hockey in the USA
USARS Hardballhockey Blog
HoqueiPatins.cat - World Roller Hockey

 
Women's roller hockey
Recurring sporting events established in 1992